Don Opeloge (born 13 May 1999) is a Samoan weightlifter. He won the gold medal in the men's 96kg event at the 2022 Commonwealth Games held in Birmingham, England. He won the silver medal in the men's 85kg event at the 2018 Commonwealth Games held in Gold Coast, Australia.

Opeloge comes from a weightlifting family. His brother Niusila and his sister Ele both won gold at the 2010 Commonwealth Games, in New Delhi.

At the 2017 Asian Indoor and Martial Arts Games held in Ashgabat, Turkmenistan, he finished in 9th place in the men's 85kg event. In 2018, he won silver at the Commonwealth Games on the Gold Coast, Queensland.

In 2019, he won the gold medal in the men's 89kg event at the Junior World Weightlifting Championships held in Suva, Fiji. A month later, he represented Samoa at the 2019 Pacific Games and he won the gold medal in the men's 89kg event. The 2019 Commonwealth Weightlifting Championships were also held at the same time and his total result also gave him the gold medal in this event.

In December 2022 he was named by the Samoa Observer as one of its people of the year.

References

External links 
 

Living people
1999 births
Place of birth missing (living people)
Samoan male weightlifters
Commonwealth Games gold medallists for Samoa
Commonwealth Games silver medallists for Samoa
Weightlifters at the 2018 Commonwealth Games
Weightlifters at the 2022 Commonwealth Games
Commonwealth Games medallists in weightlifting
Medallists at the 2018 Commonwealth Games
Medallists at the 2022 Commonwealth Games